Otto Olsen may refer to:

 Otto Olsen (sport shooter) (1884–1953), Norwegian sport shooter
 Otto Olsen (pentathlete) (1894–1989), Danish pentathlete